Bernardo Morgado Gaspar Lopes (born 30 July 1993) is a professional footballer who plays for Gibraltarian club Lincoln Red Imps as a central defender. Born and raised in Portugal, Lopes represents Gibraltar at international level.

International career
After spending 6 years playing in Gibraltar, he became a British Overseas Territory citizen and naturalised for Gibraltar in time to be called up for friendlies against Grenada and the Faroe Islands in March 2022.

Career statistics

International

References

External links

Portuguese League profile 

1993 births
Living people
Sportspeople from Cascais
Gibraltarian footballers
Gibraltar international footballers
Portuguese footballers
Portuguese emigrants to Gibraltar
Gibraltarian people of Portuguese descent
Association football defenders
Liga Portugal 2 players
Segunda Divisão players
Louletano D.C. players
C.S. Marítimo players
Lincoln Red Imps F.C. players
Portuguese expatriate footballers
Expatriate footballers in Gibraltar
Portuguese expatriate sportspeople in Gibraltar